Scheperville is an unincorporated community in the central  part of Liberty Township in Bollinger County, Missouri, United States.
A post office was in operation between 1882–1902.

GNIS reference
The Scheperville post office is recorded in the Geographic Names Information System (GNIS) at location of unknown.

References

Unincorporated communities in Bollinger County, Missouri
Cape Girardeau–Jackson metropolitan area
Unincorporated communities in Missouri